Khaleed "Khleo" Leon Thomas (born January 30, 1989) is an American actor, influencer, gamer, host and entrepreneur.

Khleo first garnered recognition as Hector "Zero" Zeroni in Holes, for which he was also nominated for a best supporting actor award. He has since appeared in 21 films and 16 television roles, including Walking Tall, Roll Bounce, Hurricane Season, Sons of Anarchy, Being Mary Jane, Major Crimes, and Shameless. He has also toured alongside Bow Wow, Snoop Dogg, Ice Cube, Sean Kingston and Chris Brown.

In 2017, Thomas created the lifestyle and apparel brand Slick Living. In 2018, Thomas created Goddess Living Among Men (GLAM), dedicated to empowering women.
In 2019, Thomas was featured in NBA 2K19 as the Nike representative. The following year, Thomas launched his Twitch channel dedicated gaming and pop culture.

Early life
Thomas was born in Anchorage, Alaska and lived in Germany until the age of four. His mother is a Moroccan Jew and his father is African-American. After his family settled in Southern California, he began acting in commercials at age six.

Career

In 1998, Thomas's first television appearance was on an episode of Bill Cosby's Kids Say the Darndest Things.

He has since starred in such films as Friday After Next (2002), Holes (2003), Going to the Mat (2004), Walking Tall (2004), and Roll Bounce (2005).

Thomas starred in the 2003 Disney film Holes, adapted from Louis Sachar's book of the same name. Thomas had not read the book before he was cast as Zero. To adapt to the desert climate for filming Holes, Thomas was required to participate in physical conditioning training. He recalls, "We had to climb rope, dig holes, run, go hiking, do sit-ups and push-ups. The whole time we were thinking, why do we need this? Then we get to the desert and we understood. It was so hot, you could only be in a hole for 20 minutes at a time." Thomas sang on one of the movie soundtrack's songs, "Dig It", which originated on the six-hour round-trip bus rides that transported the actors to the set.

In 2005 he became more involved in music after he began an association with fellow rapper/actor Bow Wow and his label LBW. He was featured on Bow Wow's fifth studio album The Price of Fame as well as on numerous mixtapes. He made cameo appearances in Bow Wow's "Fresh Azimiz" and "Outta My System" music videos.

In 2006, Thomas guest-starred in "Poppin' Tags", an episode of CSI: Crime Scene Investigation; and in the season four episode of House, "Ugly" in 2007. He co-starred in the first episode of the television series Teachers, which was canceled after six episodes. He starred in movies such as Remember the Daze (2007) and Hurricane Season (2009). In 2010, Thomas starred in the action film Boogie Town.

Khleo Thomas started a Twitch page in 2020. He plays games, hosts Disney trivia contests, cosplays as the ultimate Powerline, and talks to his followers.

Filmography

Discography

EPs

Mixtapes

Singles

As lead artist

As featured artist

Guest appearances

Videography

As lead artist
 "In My Soul" (2010)
 "I'm Still" (2010)
 "Lost" (2010)
 "I Got Me" (2010)
 "Feel Good Music" (2010)
 "Halloween" (2010)
 "Lights Out" (2011)
 "Floyd Mayweather" (2011)
 "Motivation Remix" (2011)
 "You Don't Fight Fair" (2011)
 "Monster & A Beat" (2011)
 "Slick" (2012)
 "Sweat It Out" (2012)
 "Fly Me Out To Cali" (2012)
 "So Many Girls" (2012)
 "Slick Music" (2012)
 "5 On It" (2014)

As featured artist
 Eric Mora - "Ain't I Freestyle" (2009)
 Indigo Charlie - "Never Change Remix (I'll Never Change)" (2010)

Cameo video appearances
Bow Wow - "Fresh Azimiz" (2005)
Bow Wow - "Outta My System" (2007)
Bow Wow - "Pretty Lady" (2010)
Soulja Boy - "All Black Everything" (2010)
Soulja Boy - "Pretty Boy Swag" (2010)(Viral Version)
Bow Wow - "For My Hood" (2010)
Paula DeAnda - "Easy" (2010)
Jonn Hart - "Who Booty" (2012)
Chris Batson - "We Got Lost Along the Way" (2014)

References

External links
 
 

20th-century American male actors
21st-century American male actors
African-American Jews
African-American male actors
American expatriates in Germany
American male child actors
American male film actors
American male television actors
American people of Moroccan-Jewish descent
American male rappers
Jewish American male actors
Jewish rappers
Living people
Male actors from Anchorage, Alaska
Musicians from Anchorage, Alaska
21st-century American rappers
21st-century American male musicians
20th-century African-American male singers
21st-century African-American musicians
21st-century American Jews
1989 births